The Alliance for National Transformation (ANT), founded on 19 March 2019, is a political party in Uganda.

Background
The Forum for Democratic Change (FDC) was the leading opposition party in Uganda during the 2000s and 2010s. On three consecutive occasions, during the presidential elections in 2006, 2011 and 2016, the party fielded retired Colonel Doctor Kizza Besigye, as the party's flag-bearer against the ruling National Resistance Movement's candidate, General Yoweri Kaguta Museveni. Dr Besigye lost the contest, on each occasion. In 2017, Patrick Oboi Amuriat won the FDC presidency against the then-party president, retired Major General Gregory Mugisha Muntu, in hotly contested elections that were allegedly characterised by character assassination and verbal attacks to the person of General Muntu as well as insults, tribal and degrading statements against the person of Patrick Amuriat Oboi by the Muntu team. In this election, Amuriat polled 641 votes against 463 votes for Muntu.

Formation of ANT
The November 2017 election of Patrick Amuriat split the FDC into two camps, one that supported a confrontational and defiance approach to the regime led by Gen. Yoweri Museveni (supported by Amuriat) and the other that supported non-confrontational institutional approach (supported by Muntu). In September 2018, Mugisha Muntu and his supporters quit the FDC party to form a new party. His main objective in the new party is to build grass-roots party structures, encourage more members to run for parliamentary seats and in local elections as well as working in coalition with like minded opposition forces, namely People Power (Robert Kyagulanyi Ssentamu aka Bobi Wine), the Democratic Party Bloc (Norbert Mao) and JEEMA (Asuman Basalirwa) with the aim of putting forward a single joint candidate to compete in the 2021 presidential elections to oust the Museveni, who has been in power since the overthrow of the democratically elected President Milton Obote after a protracted Bush War that used child soldiers and killed hundreds of thousands of innocent Ugandan civilians. Later the same month, Muntu announced that he had begun the process of forming the new party, under the code name New Formation.

In March 2019, the Electoral Commission of Uganda, approved the political party, opening the way for gazetting and opening of offices in the future.

Ms Alice Alaso, a former member of Parliament for Serere District Women Constituency and former Vice President of FDC for the Eastern Region of Uganda, is one of the promoters of the new party.

It was officially launched at the Serena Kampala Hotel, in an event attended by Members of Parliament, heads of political parties, civil society organizations and the academia. Those present at the launch included Kyadondo East MP Robert Kyagulanyi Ssentamu, Democratic Party (DP) president Norbert Mao, Uganda People’s Congress (UPC) President Jimmy Akena, the Conservative Party’s Ken Lukyamuzi, former leaders of Opposition Winifred Kiiza and Prof Morris Ogenga Latigo, Arua Municipality MP Kassiano Wadri and Bugweri County MP Abdu Katuntu, among others.

The party unveiled its official symbol, a lighting bulb, its colours (white, purple, and orange) and a logo: a map of Uganda lit with a bulb in the middle.

On 7 July 2020, Jinja East MP Paul Mwiru and Ntungamo Municipality MP Gerald Karuhanga announced that they had crossed the floor and joined the Alliance for National Transformation. The two were unveiled by the principal and presidential aspirant, and party flag bearer for the 2021 presidential elections, Gen Mugisha Muntu.

Leaders

The Interim Committee

National Coordinators
National Coordinator: – Hon. Alaso Alice Asianut
Deputy National Coordinator Operations and Mobilisation: Mr. Nyanja Musoke
Religious Affairs: Eunice Okullo
Civil Society:  Prossy Naikoba
In Charge of Workers: Siraji Nsanja
Research and Policy: Okumu Martin
National Treasurer: Hon. Christine Abia Bako
Electoral Coordinator: Dan Mugarura
Deputy Treasurer: Ismail B.
Spokesperson: Mr. Wilberforce Seryazi
Deputy Spokesperson: Sulaiman Kakaire
Coordinator, Parliament Affairs: Hon. Ekwau Florence
International and Diaspora Affairs: Grace Atuhaire
Civil Society Organisation Affairs: Prossy Naikoba
Youth Affairs: Agaba Nelson
Women's League - Amb. Edith Ssempala
Educational Institutions: Bwiruka David Bala

Regional Coordinators
Central Region: Owek. Sewava Serubiri
Western Region: Jackson Wabyona
Eastern Uganda: Hannington Basakana
Northern Uganda: Ms. Ochan Phoebe

Team of Elders
Hon. Yokasi Bihande BwambaleHon. Dan WanderaDr. Muniini K Mulera

Electoral history

Presidential elections

Parliament of Uganda elections

References

External links
Date For Unveiling Mugisha Muntu's New Party Extended As of 14 December 2018.

Political parties in Uganda
Political parties established in 2019
2019 establishments in Uganda